This is a list of institutions using the term institute of technology or polytechnic. "Institute of technology" is a designation employed for a wide range of learning institutions awarding different types of degrees and operating often at variable levels of the educational system. The English term "polytechnic" appeared in the early 19th century, from the French École Polytechnique, an engineering school founded in 1794 in Paris. While the terms "institute of technology" and "polytechnic" are synonymous, the preferred term varies from country to country.

University level
There are many university level higher learning institutions granting the highest academic degrees (including doctorate), that use the terms "institute of technology" or "polytechnic" for historic reasons:

 
Royal Melbourne Institute of Technology, Melbourne

 
Bahrain Polytechnic, Isa Town

 
Escola Politécnica da Pontifícia Universidade Católica do Rio Grande do Sul, Porto Alegre
Escola Politécnica de Pernambuco, Recife
Escola Politécnica da Universidade de São Paulo, São Paulo
Polytechnic School of Federal University of Rio de Janeiro, Rio de Janeiro

 
École Polytechnique de Montréal
Kwantlen Polytechnic University, Metro Vancouver, British Columbia

 
Federico Santa María Technical University, Valparaíso

 
Harbin Institute of Technology, Harbin, Heilongjiang

 
Czech Technical University, Prague

 
Technical University of Denmark, Copenhagen

 
National Polytechnic School, Quito

 
Kemi-Tornio University of Applied Sciences (KTUAS), Kemi-Tornio, Lapland

 
École Polytechnique, Palaiseau
École polytechnique de l'université de Nantes
Ecole Polytechnique de l'Université d'Orléans
Institut National Polytechnique de Grenoble
ParisTech (Paris Institute of Technology), Paris
Polytech Group

 
Technical University of Munich, Munich

 
Tokyo Polytechnic University

  
Polytechnic Universities of Greece (also known as Technical Universities)
Technological Educational Institute (TEI) is also known as Institute of Technology 

 
Hong Kong Polytechnic University

 
Indian Institutes of Technology
National Institutes of Technology

 
Bandung Institute of Technology, Bandung
Kalimantan Institute of Technology, Balikpapan
Sepuluh Nopember Institute of Technology, Surabaya
Sumatera Institute of Technology, Bandar Lampung

 
Amirkabir University of Technology also known as Tehran Polytechnic, Tehran
K.N.Toosi University of Technology, Tehran

 
Dublin Institute of Technology, Dublin

 
Technion - Israel Institute of Technology, Haifa

 
Politecnico di Bari
Politecnico di Milano
Politecnico di Torino
Università Politecnica delle Marche, Ancona

 
Instituto Politécnico de Macau

 
National Polytechnic Institute

 
Eastern Polytechnic, Port Harcourt, Rivers State
Yaba College of Technology (Yaba Tech), Lagos

 
Polytechnic University of the Philippines System

 
Politechnika Białostocka, Białystok
Politechnika Częstochowska, Częstochowa
Politechnika Gdańska, Gdańsk
Politechnika Koszalińska, Koszalin 
Politechnika Krakowska, Kraków
Politechnika Łódzka, Łódź
Politechnika Opolska, Opole
Politechnika Poznańska, Poznań
Politechnika Rzeszowska, Rzeszów
Politechnika Śląska, Gliwice
Politechnika Świętokrzyska, Kielce
Politechnika Warszawska, Warsaw
Politechnika Wrocławska, Wrocław 

 
Polytechnic University of Puerto Rico

 
Faculté polytechnique de l'université de Kinshasa, Kinshasa

 
Gheorghe Asachi Technical University of Iași
Politehnica University of Bucharest
Polytechnic University of Timișoara
Technical University of Cluj-Napoca

 
Saint Petersburg Polytechnical University, Saint Petersburg

 
Korea Polytechnic University

 
Universitat Politècnica de Catalunya
Universidad Politécnica de Madrid
Universitat Politècnica de València
Universidad Politécnica de Cartagena

 
Blekinge Institute of Technology
Royal Institute of Technology, Stockholm

 
École Polytechnique Fédérale de Lausanne
ETH Zurich

 
Asian Institute of Technology, Bangkok (Pathumthani)

 
Gebze Institute of Technology (GIT), Kocaeli
İzmir Institute of Technology (İYTE), İzmir

 
Abu Dhabi Polytechnic, Abu Dhabi and Al Ain

 
California Institute of Technology (Caltech), Pasadena, California
California Polytechnic State University (Cal Poly San Luis Obispo), San Luis Obispo, California
California State Polytechnic University, Pomona (Cal Poly Pomona), Pomona, California
California State Polytechnic University, Humboldt (Cal Poly Humboldt), Arcata, California
Carnegie Institute of Technology, former name of Carnegie Mellon University, Pittsburgh, Pennsylvania
DeVry Institute of Technology, former name of DeVry University, Phoenix, Arizona
Florida Institute of Technology (Florida Tech), Melbourne, Florida
Florida Polytechnic University, Lakeland, Florida
Georgia Institute of Technology (Georgia Tech), Atlanta, Georgia
Illinois Institute of Technology (IIT or Illinois Tech), Chicago, Illinois
Indiana Institute of Technology (Indiana Tech), Fort Wayne, Indiana
Kansas State University Polytechnic Campus, Salina, Kansas
Massachusetts Institute of Technology (MIT), Cambridge, Massachusetts
New Jersey Institute of Technology (NJIT), Newark, New Jersey
New Mexico Institute of Mining and Technology (New Mexico Tech), Socorro, New Mexico
New York Institute of Technology (NYIT), Old Westbury, New York
Polytechnic Institute of New York University (Poly) (NYU-Poly), Brooklyn, New York
Purdue Polytechnic Institute, West Lafayette, Indiana
Rensselaer Polytechnic Institute (RPI), Troy, New York
Rochester Institute of Technology (RIT), Rochester, New York
Rose-Hulman Institute of Technology (RHIT), Terre Haute, Indiana
State University of New York Institute of Technology (SUNYIT), Utica, New York
Stevens Institute of Technology (Stevens Tech), Hoboken, New Jersey
Southern Polytechnic State University, Marietta, Georgia
Oregon Institute of Technology (OIT or Oregon Tech), Klamath Falls, Oregon
University of Minnesota Institute of Technology, Minneapolis-St. Paul, Minnesota
University of Wisconsin-Stout, Menomonie, Wisconsin
Virginia Polytechnic Institute and State University (Virginia Tech), Blacksburg, Virginia
West Virginia University Institute of Technology (WVU Tech or West Virginia Tech), Montgomery, West Virginia
Worcester Polytechnic Institute (WPI), Worcester, Massachusetts

Other higher education
There are many other types of higher education institutions (post-secondary education) which are not universities and use the terms "institute of technology" or "polytechnic":

 
Melbourne Polytechnic, Melbourne

 
British Columbia Institute of Technology, British Columbia
Northern Alberta Institute of Technology, Edmonton, Alberta

 
Savonia Polytechnic

 
Nanyang Polytechnic
Singapore Polytechnic

 
Waterford Institute of Technology (WIT), Waterford

 
Ungku Omar Polytechnic, Ipoh

 
Christchurch Polytechnic Institute of Technology
Otago Polytechnic
Unitec Institute of Technology

 
Saifi Polytechnic, Karachi, Sindh
Textile Institute of Pakistan, Karachi, Sindh

 
Instituto Politécnico de Coimbra, Coimbra
Instituto Politécnico de Leiria, Leiria
Instituto Politécnico de Lisboa, Lisbon
Instituto Politécnico do Porto, Porto
ISLA - Instituto Politécnico de Gestão e Tecnologia, Porto

 
Tunisia Polytechnic School

 
Institute of Technology - Clovis (IOT), Clovis, California
Ivy Tech Community College of Indiana (Ivy Tech), 23 campuses throughout Indiana
Fashion Institute of Technology (FIT), New York, New York
New York City College of Technology (City Tech), Brooklyn, New York
Pennsylvania College of Technology (Penn College), Williamsport, Pennsylvania

Secondary education
There are also secondary education schools which use these words:

 
Instituto Politécnico Superior "Gral. San Martín", Rosario, Santa Fe

 
Ngee Ann Polytechnic
Republic Polytechnic
Temasek Polytechnic
Note: Polytechnics in Singapore provide industry-oriented education equivalent to a junior college or sixth form college.

 
Duncan Polytechnic High School, Fresno, California
Francis Polytechnic High School, Los Angeles, California (was the business department of Los Angeles High School in the 1890s, and became separate in 1906)
Long Beach Polytechnic High School, Long Beach, California
Polytechnic School, Pasadena, California
Baltimore Polytechnic Institute, Baltimore, Maryland
Benson Polytechnic High School, Portland, Oregon

See also 
 Institute of technology
 Institute of Technology (United States)
 Polytechnic (United Kingdom)

References

Technical universities and colleges
Vocational education
Engineering education